Sara Levi-Tanai (c. 1910 – 3 October 2005) was an Israeli choreographer and song writer. She was the founder and artistic director of the Inbal Dance Theater and recipient of the Israel Prize in dance.

Prizes and awards
 In 1964, Levi-Tanai's Book of Ruth won an award from the Théâtre des Mondes in Paris.
 In 1973, she was awarded the Israel Prize, in dance, for her contributions in the field of performing arts.
 In 1984, she won the Moshe Halevi Theater Prize, awarded by the Tel Aviv Municipality.
 In 1986, she was the first recipient of the Israel Labor Federation (Histadrut) Prize for music and dance.
 In 1988, she was made an honored citizen of Tel Aviv.

See also
List of Israel Prize recipients

References

1910s births
2005 deaths
Jews in Ottoman Palestine
Jews in Mandatory Palestine
Jewish Israeli musicians
Israeli people of Yemeni-Jewish descent
Israel Prize women recipients
Israel Prize in dancing recipients
Israeli choreographers
Israeli women songwriters
Burials at Yarkon Cemetery